is a motorway in Germany. The motorway, located within Berlin, connects Neukölln (from the A 100) to Schönefeld (ends to the A 10). Its last segment opened on 23 May 2008.

The route of the motorway follows, in parts, the former Berlin Wall. The motorway was proposed in 1992 and began construction in 1997. The first segment opened in 2004, and a second segment opened in 2008.

Exit list

|}

References

External links 

113
A113
A113